Manny Pacquiao (born 1978) is a Filipino professional boxer and politician.

Pacquiao may also refer to:

Pacquiao: The Movie, 2006 action-drama film based on a true story of Filipino boxer Manny Pacquiao
Bobby Pacquiao (born 1980), Filipino boxer, brother of Manny Pacquiao
Jinkee Pacquiao (born 1979), former vice governor of Sarangani, in Mindanao, Philippines, wife of Manny Pacquiao